Helge Sivertsen (12 June 1913 – 21 December 1986) was a Norwegian school administrator and elected official. He was best known as a champion  discus thrower in the 1936 Summer Olympics.

Biography
He was born at Mandal in Vest-Agder,  Norway. He was the son of  Nils Sivertsen (1877-1955) and Martha Heddeland (1883-1962).
His father was a college teacher  and the family moved to Inderøy  in 1926.

He attended folk school (Orkdal Landslymnas) and took artium in 1933. Sivertsen was a historian by education. He  studied at the University of  Oslo and became cand.philol. in 1940 with a history major.  From 1938 to 1939, he studied  history, politics and international relations at University of Oxford under a   Norwegian Oxford Scholarship.

He represented Inderøy IL in athletics competitions. He became Norwegian champion in discus throw in 1934 and 1935. At the 1936 Summer Olympics in Berlin, he finished tenth in the discus final with a throw of 45.89 metres. His personal best throw was 47.72 metres, achieved in July 1936 at Bislett stadion in Oslo.

 

During the occupation of Norway by Nazi Germany (1940-1945), he was a member of Milorg. Sivertsen  led the center's information service.  After the liberation of Norway in 1945, he became secretary of the Military Investigation Commission of 1945 and wrote the history of Milorg activities during the war years.  

His party affiliation was to the Labour Party.
Sivertsen pursued a career in politics, and was secretary to the Prime Minister Einar Gerhardsen in 1947, state secretary to the Minister of Education and Church Affairs from 1947 to 1956, and Minister of Education and Church Affairs from 1960 to 1965 in the third and fourth cabinet Gerhardsen, only interrupted by the short-lived cabinet of Prime Minister John Lyng in 1963.

He was director of education in Oslo, Akershus and Østfold from 1956 to 1960, in Oslo and Akershus from 1966 to 1970 and in Oslo from 1971. 
He served as a member of the Board of the United States Educational Foundation in Norway from 1949 to 1956.
He was chairman of the Teacher Education Council 1957-1960 and of the State Scholarship Council 1955–1960. He retired in 1981.

Personal life
He was married in 1940 with Merle Five (1914–2003), daughter of Håkon Five (1880–1944) who served as a Member of Parliament from Nord-Trøndelag.

References

External links
Library of the Norwegian workers' movement 

1913 births
1986 deaths
People from Vest-Agder
University of Oslo alumni
Alumni of the University of Oxford
20th-century Norwegian historians
Norwegian sportsperson-politicians
Norwegian state secretaries
Norwegian male discus throwers
Athletes (track and field) at the 1936 Summer Olympics
Olympic athletes of Norway
Norwegian resistance members
Labour Party (Norway) politicians
Government ministers of Norway
20th-century Norwegian writers
Ministers of Education of Norway